The Drugs were a five-piece Australian alternative rock band. Formed in 1998 by Ian Baddley on lead vocals and keyboards; David Live on lead vocals and bass guitar; Harry Snow on drums; and Mark Tracks on lead guitar, they released their first single, "Pop Song", in April 2000. Their debut album, Music's in Trouble, appeared in October 2002. Their second album, The Very Next Of, was issued in September 2004. The Drugs were nominated for Best Comedy Release at the ARIA Music Awards of 2001 for their debut extended play, The Only Way Is Up (September 2000). They received two further nominations in the same category, in 2002 for their single, "The Bold and the Beautiful" and in 2002 for Music's in Trouble. They broke up in 2005, and reunited in 2008 for a national tour before disbanding again in 2009. A heavily fictionalised mockumentary about the band, Masking Agents, was released in November 2011.

History 
In 2003 the band's single, "The Bold and the Beautiful", was performed on Rove Live with United States TV soap opera, The Bold and the Beautifuls cast member Ronn Moss miming bass guitar. At the ARIA Music Awards of 2002, the single was nominated for Best Comedy Release. The group's debut album, Music's in Trouble, was released in October 2003 to positive acclaim. It includes the two singles, ten new tracks, two bonus tracks from The Only Way Is Up EP and four filler tracks. A third single, "Burger King", was released for free online. The album also received a nomination for Best Comedy Release at the ARIA Music Awards of 2003.

During 2003 the Drugs and Melbourne-based rap metal band, 28 Days, engaged in a "feud": it started with an "internet stoush", escalated into "a bar brawl" with "over $4,000 damage to equipment", and initiated a police investigation. Baddley had posted a letter on his group's website which criticised 28 Days' lead singer, Jay Dunne, "accusing him of being homophobic and using hateful labels on stage at the Big Day Out" earlier that year.

Dunne and another member of 28 Days appeared at the Drugs gig at the Duke of Windsor Hotel, Windsor, in late February 2003. According to Patrick Donovan of The Age, "Witnesses said cigarette butts were thrown at the Sydney satirical/indie rock band while they played, a drink was poured over their computer, an amplifier was damaged and the tyres on their hire car were slashed." Baddley told Paul Cashmere of Undercover News, "This attack was poorly thought out and regardless of its success in destroying our show was a cowardly and stupid attack borne of an intellectually impaired 'pack mentality'."

In 2004 the Drugs released a track, "I Was a Teenage Voter", for a various artists' compilation album, Rock Against Howard. Their second album, The Very Next Of, was released in September 2004, which included "I Was a Teenage Voter", two then-radio-only tracks ("Rogue States" and "Appease Your God"), 15 new tracks and 7 filler tracks. This is their last album. In 2005 they played their final concert at the Metro in Sydney. Their back catalogue, except for The Very Next Of and "Burger King", were re-released in 2006 on iTunes.

In 2008 the Drugs reunited for a tour, We're All Going on Osama Holiday, and disbanded in the following year. In 2010 the trailer for a heavily-fictionalised mockumentary on the group, Masking Agents, was uploaded to YouTube - the film itself was released in the following year.

Members 
 Ian Baddley (Matt Downey) – keyboards, vocals
 David Live (Tim Paxton) – bass guitar, vocals
 Mark Tracks – guitar
 Benny Drill – guitar
 Harry Snow – drums
 Tyler Noll – guitar, vocals (auxiliary/tour musician)

Discography

Albums

Extended plays

Singles 
 "Pop Song" (April 2000)
 "The Bold and the Beautiful" (2002)
 "Metal vs. Hip Hop" (2002)
 "Burger King" (2002)
 "Was Sport Better in the '70s?" (2003)
 “Rogue States” (2005)

Awards and nominations

ARIA Music Awards
The ARIA Music Awards are a set of annual ceremonies presented by Australian Recording Industry Association (ARIA), which recognise excellence, innovation, and achievement across all genres of the music of Australia. They commenced in 1987. 

! 
|-
| 2001 || The Only Way Is Up || rowspan="3"| ARIA Award for Best Comedy Release ||  || rowspan="3"| 
|-
| 2002 || "The Bold and the Beautiful" ||  
|-
| 2003 || The Music Is Trouble ||  
|-

References

External links 
 

Australian rock music groups
Musical groups disestablished in 2005
Musical groups established in 1999
1999 establishments in Australia